Bimson is an English surname. Notable people with the surname include:

 Jennie Bimson (born 1976), English field hockey player
 Stuart Bimson (born 1969), English footballer

See also
 Bimson Blacksmith Shop
 Bimpson

English-language surnames